The First Pashinyan government was the 16th government of Armenia and the governing body from 12 May 2018 to 14 January 2019. Nikol Pashinyan was appointed Prime Minister by President Armen Sarkissian on 8 May 2018, after receiving a majority of votes in the National Assembly.

It was a minority government ruled by parliamentary group Way Out Alliance consisted of three political parties: Civil Contract, Bright Armenia and the Hanrapetutyun Party.

It was a coalition government formed by Way Out Alliance, Tsarukyan Alliance, and Armenian Revolutionary Federation until 3 October 2018.

The current structure of the government of Armenia consists of seventeen ministries and eight adjunct bodies. Each ministry is responsible for elaborating and implementing governmental decisions in its respective sphere.

On 3 October 2018, Pashinyan fired six ministers after their parties (Armenian Revolutionary Federation and Tsarukyan Alliance) supported a controversial bill which will make it harder for the Prime Minister to call snap elections to the National Assembly. On the same day, the ARF accused Pashinyan of "attempting to establish one-party rule in Armenia".

Structure

Governing staff

Bodies under the Government

Bodies under the Prime Minister

References

Politics of Armenia
Political organizations based in Armenia
Government of Armenia
European governments
Cabinets established in 2018
Nikol Pashinyan
2018 establishments in Armenia
2019 disestablishments in Armenia
Cabinets disestablished in 2019